An Independent Testing Authority (ITA) is a laboratory certified by the United States-based National Association of State Election Directors (NASED) to test voting systems to the Voting System Standards (VSS) or the Voluntary Voting System Guidelines (VVSG) in the process of certifying voting systems.  The Election Assistance Commission has taken over the responsibility for accrediting such laboratories and now uses the National Institute of Standards and Technology's National Voluntary Laboratory Accreditation Program.  Under the EAC process, ITA's are now known as Voting System Testing Laboratories (VSTLs).

Election technology